A Twenty20 International (T20I) is an international cricket match between two teams that have official T20I status, as determined by the International Cricket Council (ICC). It is played under the rules of Twenty20 cricket and is the shortest form of the game. The first such match was played on 17 February 2005 between Australia and New Zealand. The Sri Lanka national cricket team played its first T20I match on 15 June 2006, against England as part of Sri Lanka's 2006 England tour, winning the match by 2 runs.

Sri Lanka recorded the highest team total in T20I cricket on 14 September 2007, in a group stage match at the inaugural edition of the ICC World Twenty20, scoring 260 runs for 6 wickets against Kenya and winning the match by 172 run which is the highest winning margin in T20Is (till date).

This list comprises all members of the Sri Lanka cricket team who have played at least one T20I match. It is initially arranged in the order in which each player won his first Twenty20 cap. Where more than one player won his first Twenty20 cap in the same match, those players are listed alphabetically by surname.

Key

Players
Statistics correct as of 7 January 2023.

T20I captains

See also
List of Sri Lanka Test cricketers
List of Sri Lanka ODI cricketers

Notes

References

Twenty20
Sri Lanka